The following is a comprehensive discography of Saxon, an English heavy metal band.

Albums

Studio albums

Cover album

Live albums

Compilation albums
Strong Arm Metal (1984)
Anthology (1988)
Back on the Streets (1990)
The Best of Saxon (1991)
A Collection of Metal (1996)
Burrn! Presents: The Best of Saxon (2000)
Diamonds and Nuggets (2000)
Masters of Rock: Saxon (2001)
Heavy Metal Thunder (2002) (re-recordings)
Coming to the Rescue (2002)
The Very Best of Saxon (1979–1988) (2007)
The Best of Saxon (2009)
Saxon – The Carrere Years (1979–1984) (Box Set) (2012) 
Saxon – The EMI Years (1985–1988) (Box Set) (2012)
Unplugged and Strung Up (2013) (orchestral + acoustic)
The Complete Albums 1979-1988 (10-CD boxed set) (2014)
Baptism in Fire – The Collection 1991–2009 (2016)

Videos
Live (1983)
Live Innocence! (1985)
Greatest Hits Live! (1989)
Power & the Glory – Video Anthology (1990)
The Saxon Chronicles (2003)
Live Innocence – The Power & the Glory (2003)
To Hell and Back Again (2007)
Saxon: Heavy Metal Thunder – Live (2010)
Heavy Metal Thunder – Live: Eagles Over Wacken (2012)
Warriors of the Road – The Saxon Chronicles Part II (2014)
The Saxon Chronicles (2015)
Let Me Feel Your Power (2016)

Singles

References

Heavy metal group discographies
Discographies of British artists